George Marshall (20 December 1829 – 6 March 1868) was an Australian cricketer. He played eleven first-class cricket matches for Victoria between 1857 and 1864.

See also
 List of Victoria first-class cricketers

References

1829 births
1868 deaths
Australian cricketers
Victoria cricketers
Cricketers from Nottingham
Melbourne Cricket Club cricketers